Metrogorodok District  is the northernmost administrative district (55° 50' 19.26" 37° 44' 55.32"E) (raion) of Eastern Administrative Okrug, and one of the 125 raions of Moscow, Russia.

Despite that fact, the ecological situation is assessed as unfavorable because of the Kaloshino industrial zone, combined heat and power station No. 23 and felling of forest zones.

The municipality got its name from the metro builders settlement, which arose in the 1930s during the construction of the first stage of the Moscow metro.

See also
Administrative divisions of Moscow

References

Notes

Sources

Districts of Moscow
Eastern Administrative Okrug